The Battle of Chamla was fought in Buner District of Swat, Pakistan between the forces of the Nawab of Amb and the Wāli of Swat. The conflict was due to a border dispute. The rulers of Afghanistan were allies of Swat. The Army of Amb with howitzer artillery and guns, defeated the army of Swat. The State of Swat surrendered to Nawab of Amb and the ruler of Swat was captured.

References

Barakzai dynasty
Buner District
History of Pakistan